Ralph Peterson Jr. (May 20, 1962 – March 1, 2021) was an American jazz drummer and bandleader.

Early life
Four of Peterson's uncles and his grandfather were drummers. Peterson himself began on percussion at age three. He was raised in Pleasantville, where he played trumpet at Pleasantville High School and worked locally in funk groups. He applied to Livingston College and Rutgers to study drums, but he failed the percussion entrance exam and enrolled as a trumpeter instead, graduating in 1984.

Later life and career
In 1983, he joined Art Blakey's Jazz Messengers as the group's second drummer for several years. He worked with Terence Blanchard and Donald Harrison in 1984, and with Walter Davis (1985, 1989), Tom Harrell (1985), Out of the Blue (1985–1988), Branford Marsalis (1986), David Murray, Craig Harris (1987), James Spaulding (1988), Roy Hargrove (1989), Jon Faddis (1989), Dewey Redman, Mark Helias (1989), and Wynton Marsalis (with the Count Basie ghost band).

During the 1990s, Peterson played as a sideman with Jack Walrath, Craig Handy, Charles Lloyd, Kip Hanrahan (1992), Bheki Mseleku, Courtney Pine, Steve Coleman, George Colligan, Stanley Cowell, Mark Shim, and Betty Carter.

He began recording as a leader in 1988, with a quintet (Terence Blanchard, Steve Wilson, Geri Allen, and Phil Bowler) on V and Volition. He also worked with Allen and Bowler as a trio in "Triangular"; Essiet Essiet replaced Bowler for the 1988 Triangular recording. In 1989 he recorded in the quartet format as "The Fo'tet" with Don Byron, Steve Wilson (later Bobby Franchesini), Melissa Slocum (later Belden Bullock), and Bryan Carrott. After living in Canada for some time, he returned to Philadelphia, where he worked again with "The Fo'tet,” and recorded as Triangular 2 with Slocum and Uri Caine. He also led the group "Hip Pocket,” with whom he played trumpet.

Peterson taught at Berklee College of Music in Boston and University of the Arts in Philadelphia. In 2010, Peterson started his own Onyx Productions Music Label.

Peterson died at his home in Dartmouth, Massachusetts, from complications of cancer on March 1, 2021, at age 58.

Discography

As leader
 V (Blue Note, 1988)
 Triangular (Blue Note, 1989)
 Volition (Blue Note, 1990)
 Ralph Peterson Presents the Fo'tet (Somethin' Else, 1990)
 Ornettology (Somethin' Else, 1991)
 Art (Blue Note, 1993)
 The Reclamation Project (Evidence, 1995)
 The Fo'tet Plays Monk (Evidence, 1997)
 Back to Stay (Sirocco, 1999)
 Triangular 2 (Sirocco, 2000)
 The Art of War (Criss Cross, 2001)
 Subliminal Seduction (Criss Cross, 2002)
 Tests of Time (Criss Cross, 2003)
 The Fo'tet Augmented (Criss Cross, 2004)
 Outer Reaches (Onyx, 2010)
 The Duality Perspective (Onyx 2012)
 Alive at Firehouse 12 Vol. 1 (Onyx, 2013)
 Alive at Firehouse 12 Vol. 2: Fo' n Mo (Onyx, 2016)
 Triangular III (Onyx, 2016)
 Dream Deferred (Onyx, 2016)
 I Remember Bu: Alive Vol. 4 @ Scullers (Onyx, 2018)
 Inward Venture: Alive Vol. 5 At The Side Door (Onyx 2018)
 Legacy Alive Vol. 6 at the Side Door (Onyx, 2019)
 Listen Up! (Onyx, 2019)
 Onward & Upward (Onyx, 2020)
 Raise Up Off Me (Onyx, 2021)

As sideman
With Uri Caine
 Sphere Music (Winter & Winter, 2005)
 Toys (JMT, 1995)
 Blue Wail (Winter & Winter, 1999)
 The Goldberg Variations (Winter & Winter, 2000)

With Wayne Escoffery
 Intuition (Nagel Heyer, 2004)
 Live at Smalls (SmallsLIVE, 2015)
 Vortex (Sunnyside, 2018)
 The Humble Warrior (Smoke Sessions, 2020)

With Orrin Evans
 Captain Black (Criss Cross, 1998)
 Grown Folk Bizness (Criss Cross, 1999)
 Mother's Touch (Posi-Tone, 2014)

With David Murray
 New Life (Black Saint, 1987)
 Lovers (DIW, 1988)
 I Want to Talk About You (Black Saint, 1989)
 Deep River (DIW, 1989)
 Ballads (DIW, 1990)
 Spirituals (DIW, 1990)
 Hope Scope (Black Saint, 1991)
 Tenors (DIW, 1993)

With others
 Melissa Aldana, Free Fall (Inner Circle Music, 2010)
 Pat Bianchi, Back Home (Doodlin, 2010)
 Terence Blanchard, Discernment (Bellaphon, 1986)
 Don Braden, Contemporary Standards Ensemble (Double-Time, 2000)
 Anthony Branker, Spirit Songs (Sons of Sound, 2005)
 Don Byron, Tuskegee Experiments (Nonesuch, 1992)
 Don Byron, Music for Six Musicians (Nonesuch, 1995)
 George Colligan, Activism (SteepleChase, 1996)
 George Colligan, Ultimatum (Criss Cross, 2002)
 Stanley Cowell, Mandara Blossoms (SteepleChase, 1996)
 Anthony Cox, Factor of Faces (Minor Music, 1993)
 Walter Davis Jr., Scorpio Rising (SteepleChase, 1989)
 Duane Eubanks, My Shining Hour (TCB, 1999)
 Duane Eubanks, Second Take (TCB, 2001)
 Jon Faddis, Into the Faddisphere (Epic, 1989)
 Craig Handy, Split Second Timing (Arabesque, 1992)
 Craig Handy, Introducing Three for All + One (Arabesque, 1993)
 Kip Hanrahan, Exotica (American Clave, 1992)
 Roy Hargrove, Diamond in the Rough (Novus, 1990)
 Tom Harrell, Moon Alley (Criss Cross, 1986)
 Craig Harris, Blackout in the Square Root of Soul (JMT, 1988)
 Donald Harrison, Nascence (CBS, 1986)
 Sean Jones, Eternal Journey (Mack Avenue, 2004)
 Charles Lloyd, Notes from Big Sur (ECM, 1992)
 Charles Lloyd, Quartets (ECM, 2013)
 Frank Lowe, Soul Folks No More (No. 10, 2001)
 Carmen Lundy, This Is Carmen Lundy (Afrasia, 2001)
 Branford Marsalis, Royal Garden Blues (CBS, 1986)
 Delfeayo Marsalis, An Evening with Delfeayo Marsalis Kalamazoo (Troubadour Jass, 2017)
 Bheki Mseleku, Beauty of Sunrise (Verve, 1997)
 Jeremy Pelt, Profile (Fresh Sound, 2002)
 Jeremy Pelt, Insight (Criss Cross, 2003)
 Jamaaladeen Tacuma, Groove 2000 (Caramelle, 1998)
 James Spaulding, Gotstabe a Better Way! (Muse, 1990)
 Michele Rosewoman, Occasion to Rise (Somethin' Else, 1991)
 Mark Shim, Mind Over Matter (Blue Note, 1998)
 Bobby Watson, Quiet As It's Kept (Red Record, 1999)

References

Sources
 Gary W. Kennedy, "Ralph Peterson Jr.". Grove Jazz online.
 Scott Yanow, [ Ralph Peterson] at Allmusic

External links
 
 

1962 births
2021 deaths
20th-century American drummers
20th-century American male musicians
21st-century American drummers
21st-century American male musicians
American jazz drummers
American male drummers
American male jazz musicians
Blue Note Records artists
Criss Cross Jazz artists
Deaths from cancer in Massachusetts
Musicians from New Jersey
Out of the Blue (American band) members
People from Dartmouth, Massachusetts
People from Pleasantville, New Jersey
Pleasantville High School (New Jersey) alumni
Rutgers University alumni
University of the Arts (Philadelphia) faculty